The Finnish Environment Institute (SYKE) is a multidisciplinary research and expert institute under the Ministry of the Environment, Finland. SYKE has four office and research facilities in Helsinki, Oulu, Jyväskylä and Joensuu.

References

External links
Introduction to the Finnish Environment Institute SYKE

Government of Finland
Environmental organisations based in Finland